Beočin is a town and municipality located in the South Bačka District of the autonomous province of Vojvodina, Serbia. The population of the town is 7,839, whilst Beočin's municipality population is 15,726. There is also a Beočin Monastery from the 16th century in the municipality.

Name
In Serbian, the town is known as Beočin (Беочин), in Croatian as Beočin, in Hungarian as Belcsény, in German (dated) as Beotschin, in Slovak as Beočín, and in Rusyn as Беочин.

The name of the town derives from the word that came from local Serbian dialect, which in modern standard Serbian would be written as "beli otac" or in English as "white father" (the full meaning of the name is "the place that belong to white father"). The name referred to the prior of the nearby Beočin monastery.

Geography

Although it is geographically located in Syrmia, Beočin administratively belong to South Bačka District. The town of Beočin is divided into two parts: Beočin Grad ("Beočin town") and Beočin Selo ("Beočin village"). However, no matter that Beočin Selo is called a village, it is not a village but simply part of the town.

History
The existence of the Serbian Orthodox monastery of Beočin (which is located 2 km in the south from modern town) was first recorded by the sources in 1566-67. Until the end of the 18th century, a small settlement (hamlet) existed near this monastery. During Ottoman administration, this settlement was populated by ethnic Serbs.

The settlement that developed into modern Beočin was mentioned in 1702, by then the hamlet had grown into 49 households. In the beginning, it was only a village, and its basic economic activity was wine production (even today, the oldest part of Beočin is known as Beočin Selo, i.e. "Beočin village" in English). After the cement factory was opened (in 1839), Beočin developed into a modern town, which over time became the centre of the northern Syrmia. The cement factory in Beočin is one of the largest cement factories in Europe. New, urban part of the town, started to develop as worker's colony and it was known as Fabrika ("factory"), Beočin Fabrika ("Beočin factory") and Beočin Grad ("Beočin town").

Until the middle of the 18th century, the village of Beočin was under Habsburg military administration. After 1745, it was part of the Syrmia County, which was one of three counties of the Habsburg Kingdom of Slavonia. In 1828, majority of inhabitants of Beočin village were Orthodox Christians.

In 1848–49, Beočin was part of Serbian Vojvodina, while from 1849 to 1860 it was part of the Voivodeship of Serbia and Banat of Temeschwar. After the abolishment of the voivodeship in 1860, Beočin was again incorporated into Syrmia County of the Kingdom of Slavonia. In 1868, Kingdom of Slavonia was joined with the Kingdom of Croatia into the Kingdom of Croatia-Slavonia, which was part of the Kingdom of Hungary and Austria-Hungary. In 1910, population of Beočin Selo numbered 3,342 inhabitants, while population of Beočin Fabrika numbered 262 inhabitants. According to 1910 census, largest ethnic group in Beočin were Serbs, while other ethnic groups that lived in the settlement included Hungarians, Germans, Croats, and others.

In 1918, Beočin first became part of the State of Slovenes, Croats and Serbs, then part of the Kingdom of Serbia and finally part of the Kingdom of Serbs, Croats and Slovenes (later renamed to Yugoslavia). From 1918 to 1922, Beočin was part of the Syrmia county, from 1922 to 1929 part of the Syrmia oblast, from 1929 to 1939 part of the Danube Banovina, and from 1939 to 1941 part of the Banovina of Croatia. During World War II, from 1941 to 1944, Beočin was occupied by Axis troops and was included into the Pavelić's Independent State of Croatia. During the Axis occupation, 66 civilians were killed in Beočin by fascists. In 1944, Beočin was liberated by Yugoslav partisans. Since 1944, the town is part of Vojvodina, which (from 1945) was an autonomous province of Serbia and Yugoslavia.

Until the end of World War II, Beočin was part of Ilok municipality. Since the newly established post-WW2 border between Vojvodina (Serbia) and Croatia divided former Ilok municipality, Beočin was included into Novi Sad municipality. Later, separate municipality of Beočin was established. In 1948, population of Beočin Fabrika numbered 2,144 inhabitants, while population of Beočin Selo numbered 1,495.

Demographics

According to the 2011 census results, the municipality of Beočin has 15,726 inhabitants.

Number of inhabitants over time

Inhabited places

Beočin municipality encompasses the town of Beočin, and the following villages:

Ethnic groups
Most of the settlements in the municipality have an ethnic Serb majority, while the village of Lug have an ethnic Slovak majority. Ethnic composition of the city:

Beočin is one of the centers of the Islamic Community of Vojvodina. As of 2006, it was one of the three settlements in Vojvodina where Islamic religious buildings could be found (The other two settlements are Novi Sad and Subotica).

Culture
The oldest Serb rural schools in Vojvodina were established in the territory of present-day Beočin municipality: in Grabovo (1625) and Sviloš (1695). There are also two important Serbian Orthodox monasteries in the territory of this municipality: Beočin monastery, whose existence was first recorded in 1566-67 and Rakovac monastery, whose existence was first recorded in 1545-48.

Economy
The following table gives a preview of total number of employed people per their core activity (as of 2017):

Gallery

Twin Cities
  Ugljevik, Bosnia and Herzegovina since 1982.
  Nováky, Slovakia
  Battonya, Hungary

See also
 Syrmia
 List of places in Serbia
 List of cities, towns and villages in Vojvodina

References

Miloš Lukić, Putevima slobode - naselja opštine Beočin u ratu i revoluciji, Novi Sad, 1987.
Slobodan Ćurčić, Broj stanovnika Vojvodine, Novi Sad, 1996.
Slobodan Ćurčić, Naselja Srema - geografske karakteristike, Novi Sad, 2000.
Sekula Petrović, Beo-činovi, pozorišni život u Beočinu 1908-2009, Ruma, 2009.

Notes

External links

www.beocin.rs
www.beocingrad.com
Beocin.net 

 
Populated places in South Bačka District
Populated places in Syrmia
Municipalities and cities of Vojvodina
Towns in Serbia